Red Moor may refer to:

 Red Moor (nature reserve), a nature reserve and SSSI in Cornwall, England
 Red Moor (Rhön), an important wetland in Hesse, Germany
 Red Moors, an Italian political party